"Danke Schoen" is a pop song of German origin. Bert Kaempfert, who composed the melody, recorded it as an instrumental, in 1959 and later in 1962, under the title "Candlelight Cafe". Kurt Schwabach wrote the German lyrics. The song gained international fame in 1963 when singer Wayne Newton recorded an American version, with English lyrics by Milt Gabler. The song achieved renewed popularity when it was featured in the 1986 American comedy film Ferris Bueller's Day Off, lip-synced by the main character, Ferris Bueller (Matthew Broderick).

Newton's version
Wayne Newton's first version was released when he was 21 years old. The song was originally intended for singer Bobby Darin as a follow-up to his hit single "18 Yellow Roses" in the spring of 1963, but after seeing Newton perform at the Copacabana, Darin decided to give the song to Newton and transposed the key of the recording to fit Newton's voice. It has been featured in many television commercials and motion pictures, such as Ferris Bueller's Day Off, Meet the Parents, Matchstick Men, Vegas Vacation, Fools Rush In as well as the French-American comedy Crime Spree. In 2015 it was used in a television commercial for Bank of America, and in 2017 in a trailer for the video game Wolfenstein II: The New Colossus. In 2016 the song was used in a series of commercials for Australian insurer AAMI. The Newton version peaked at No. 13 on Billboards pop chart, and No. 3 on its easy listening chart.

Personnel

According to the AFM contract sheet, the following musicians appeared at the recording session.

Jimmie Haskell - session leader, arrangements
Leon Russell
Jimmy Bond
Hal Blaine
Carol Kaye
Glen Campbell
Tommy Tedesco
Louis Blackburn
Kenneth Shroyer
Roy Caton
Virgil Evans
Donald “Ritchie” Frost
Emil Richards
Tibor Zelig
Jerome Reisler
Harold Dicterow
William Kurasch

Other versions
Connie Francis recorded the song in French, Japanese, Spanish and Italian, keeping the original title line "Danke schoen" in all versions except the Italian recording, which was released as Grazie a te.

Brenda Lee recorded "Danke Schoen" for her 1964 album By Request, produced by Owen Bradley.

Martha and The Vandellas recorded a version for their 1963 album Heat Wave.

Rio Romeo recorded "Danke Schoen" in 2023 for their Valentine's day album, titled "Rio Romeo's Valentine."

Linguistic details

In German, the phrase  is equivalent to the English expressions 'thank you very much' or 'thank you kindly'. The word Danke means 'thanks' and schön means 'pretty', 'lovely', or 'nice'. In Standard German the word schön is pronounced with a close-mid front rounded vowel, that is not used in English phonology. In Newton's version of the song, however, the word schön is pronounced to rhyme with the English words pain and explain.

Orthographically, when writing in these dialects, ö becomes e or ee and ü becomes i or ie.

Hence, in Low German dialects commonly encountered in the United States, such as Pennsylvania German, the word schön rhymes with the English words 'pain' and 'explain'. Standard German Danke schön would be translated into Pennsylvania German as danki schee or dank scheene. Similarly, it would be translated into Yiddish . The German letter "ö" can also be written using the older typography "oe" (schön = schoen) – of which the umlauted "O" is a contraction – when umlauts are unavailable or not readily accessible. Milt Gabler, the author of the English lyrics of the song, was the son of Austrian and Russian Jewish immigrants and would have been most familiar with the Yiddish pronunciation of the word schön (or schoen) as sheyn.

In media
In 2020, the song was used in the "Come Dance" trailer for the video game Vampire: The Masquerade – Bloodlines 2 which premiered at the Inside Xbox online showcase.

References

External links
Song lyrics

1962 songs
German-language songs
Songs with music by Bert Kaempfert
Songs with lyrics by Milt Gabler
Wayne Newton songs
Anita Lindblom songs
Capitol Records singles